Mona Chandravati Gupta (1896 - 1984) was a British Burma born Indian social worker, educationist and the founder of Nari Sewa Samiti, a non governmental organization working for the social and economic upliftment of women.

Biography
Gupta was born in Rangoon, present day Yangon and the capital city of Myanmar, on 20 October 1896 and after early education at Yangon and London, she secured her graduate degree from Diocesan College, Kolkata. Taking up a career in education, she worked as the vice principal of the Government Girls College, Lucknow and served as a member of the University Review Committee for women's education.

Gupta started two women's organizations in the 1930s, Zenana Park League in 1931 and Women’s Social Service League in 1936. Almost a decade later, she founded the Women's Academy and after the Indian independence in 1947, the academy was merged with Women’s Social Service League to form Nari Sewa Samiti. The organization has now grown to cover four educational institutions, two vocational centres for women, three women's welfare centres, a cultural centre and a medical facility.

Gupta was a former member of Uttar Pradesh Legislative Council and served the courts of Allahabad University and Lucknow University in 1939 and 1940 respectively. A winner of the Kaisar-i-Hind Medal from the British Indian administration in 1939, she was honoured by the Government of India in 1965, with the award of Padma Shri, the fourth highest Indian civilian award for her contributions to the society.

See also

 Allahabad University
 Lucknow University

References

Recipients of the Padma Shri in social work
1896 births
1984 deaths
Social workers
Indian women educational theorists
Recipients of the Kaisar-i-Hind Medal
20th-century Indian educational theorists
19th-century Indian women
19th-century Indian people
20th-century Indian women scientists
Women educators from Uttar Pradesh
Educators from Uttar Pradesh
Social workers from Uttar Pradesh
People from Kolkata
Scholars from Uttar Pradesh
Women in Uttar Pradesh politics
20th-century Indian politicians
20th-century Indian women politicians
20th-century women educators
Indian expatriates in British Burma
Expatriates of British India in the United Kingdom